Chettipalayam Road, SH 162 is an arterial road in city of Coimbatore, Tamil Nadu, India. This road connects the city with Coimbatore Integrated Bus Terminus and Podanur Junction.

It is a four lane road from Podanur to Chettipalayam

Flyovers
In Chettipalayam Road, the Podanur flyover was opened in 2018 to reduce traffic congestion by the railway crossing in the Podanur-Palakkad railway line.

A grade separator has been planned at the L&T Bypass Road junction to facilitate the vehicle movement towards the Coimbatore Integrated Bus Terminus

Railway stations along Chettipalayam Road
 Podanur Junction railway station
 Chettipalayam (defunct)

Bus Terminals along Chettipalayam Road
 Coimbatore Integrated Bus Terminus

Places transversed
 Podanur Junction railway station
 Kanjikonampalayam Pirivu
 Coimbatore Integrated Bus Terminus
 Eachanari Pirivu
 L&T Bypass Junction
 Chettipalayam

Major Landmarks on Chettipalayam Road 
Podanur Junction railway station
Coimbatore Integrated Bus Terminus

Educational institutions
GD Hospital

Coimbatore Metro 
Coimbatore Metro feasibility study is completed and one of the corridor planned from Ukkadam Bus Terminus to Coimbatore Integrated Bus Terminus covering 10 km.

References

Roads in Coimbatore